The Canton City School District (CCSD) is a public school district serving students in Canton, Ohio in the United States. In the 2020–2021 academic year its student enrollment was 8,000, making it the 22nd largest school district in the state. The district operates an early childhood center, twelve elementary schools, three middle schools and two 9–12 high schools. In addition to traditional schools, CCSD also operates four alternative schools. While the district primarily serves students in Canton city limits, they also serve small sections of surrounding areas, as well as the village of Meyers Lake. Also, students in the northern part of the city go to the Plain Local School District.

Current schools

Early childhood center 
 Early Learning Center @ Schreiber

Elementary schools
 AIM Academy @ Belden (K-6)
Arts Academy @ Summit (K-6)
 Cedar Elementary (K-3)
 Clarendon Elementary (4–6)
 Fairmont Learning Center (K-5)
Gibbs Elementary (K-3)
Harter Elementary (K-3)
McGregor Elementary (4–6)
Patrick (Allen) Elementary (K-6)
Stone Elementary (K-3)
 Worley Elementary (K-6)
 Youtz Elementary (4–6)

Middle schools 
Crenshaw Middle (7–8)
Early College Middle @ Lehman (7–8)
STEAMM Academy @ Hartford Middle (4–8)

High schools
 Early College High @ Lehman (9–12)
 McKinley High School

Other schools 

Bulldog Virtual Academy (K-8 @ Mason, 9–12 @ Timken)
Compton Learning Center (Passages, Choices)
Timken Career Campus
Canton Adult Education Center

Former schools and current state

Former elementary schools 
 Baxter Elementary School (abandoned) 
 Burns (J.J.) Elementary School (razed)
 Garfield Elementary School (Beacon Academy, Stark High School)
Horace Mann Elementary (Canton Harbor High School)
 Martin Elementary School (The Martin Center)
 Stark Elementary School (razed)
 Washington Elementary School (razed)
 Wells Elementary School (community center)
 West-North Elementary School (razed)
Dueber Elementary School (community center)
Smith Elementary School (razed)

Former high school buildings
 Canton High School (Renamed Canton Central when McKinley was built [1918], razed to build Timken H.S.)
 North High School (Razed to build Lehman [1932])
 Lehman High School (Oxford Place Senior Living Facility)
 Lincoln High School (Heritage Christian School)
 Timken High School (Timken Career Campus also known as Timken campus/downtown campus)

Athletics 
CCSD is part of the Federal League athletic conference, along with 6 other districts.

List of sports offered

References

External links
 Official Site

School districts in Stark County, Ohio